Yelena Sidorchenkova Orlova (born 30 May 1980) is a Russian long-distance runner who specializes in the 3000 metres steeplechase.

She finished sixth in 3000 m steeplechase at the 2006 European Athletics Championships and eleventh in 3000 metres at the 2008 World Indoor Championships.

On 12 February 2012, running under the name of Yelena Orlova, she claimed the World Record in the rarely run and non-standard, indoor 2000 metres steeplechase, running 6:06.11 at the Moscow City Championships.

Competition record

Personal bests
800 metres - 2:03.10 min (2008) 
1500 metres - 4:05.77 min (2008), indoor - 4:06.04 min (2008) 
3000 metres - 8:56.29 min (2008), indoor - 8:43.88 min (2006)
3000 metres steeplechase - 9:22.15 min (2009)
5000 metres - 15:03.88 min (2008)

References

External links 

1980 births
Living people
Russian female long-distance runners
Athletes (track and field) at the 2012 Summer Olympics
Olympic athletes of Russia
Russian female steeplechase runners